Who's Watching Oliver is a 2017 romance horror film directed by Richie Moore in his feature film debut. It was written by Moore, Raimund Huber and Russell Geoffrey Banks. The film stars Banks, Sara Malakul Lane and Margaret Roche.

Plot 
At the hands of his estranged mother's grasp, a serial killer rapes and murders women in Thailand. He meets Sophia at an amusement park in hopes of finding love and a new outlook on life.

Cast 

 Russell Geoffrey Banks
 Sara Malakul Lane
 Margaret Roche

Production 

In an interview at PopHorror, Banks reflected that Huber proposed the character of Oliver to be like Forrest Gump, Crispin Glover and Patrick Bateman. The film is Moore's feature film debut, which he claims was Banks' initial concept.

Release 

The film was released July 3, 2018 and distributed by Gravitas Ventures.

Reception 
The film has received mostly positive reviews from critics with an 80% approval rating at Rotten Tomatoes based on 10 reviews.

A review at Dread Central praised the film, stating it is "not only recommended, but required." Karli Lawson at PopHorror said it is a "disturbing film with plenty of gore." Starburst Magazine called it a "fascinating essay on the everyday life of a serial killer." Film critic Daniel M. Kimmel stated "this is clearly not a movie for everyone, with the nudity, violence, and just plain insanity" scoring it 3 out of 5. Patrick King at Cultured Vultures called it "one of the better horror movies I’ve seen this year." Vicki Woods at Morbidly Beautiful said it is a "film that will bring out serious emotions." Bloody Disgusting claims that the "themes explored in this film [...] have certainly been done before." Roger Moore at Movie Nation scored it 1 out of 4, calling it "torture porn."

Oliver is listed on WhatCulture's 10 Most Twisted Characters In Modern Horror Movies.

References

External links 

 
 

2017 romance films
2017 horror films
Torture in films
2010s serial killer films
Thai slasher films
Thai romance films
American slasher films
American romantic horror films
American splatter films
Nudity in film
Films about violence against women
Masturbation in fiction
Mumblecore films
2010s English-language films
Films about pornography
Films set in amusement parks
Films set in Thailand
2010s American films
2010s slasher films
Films about rape